Toopran is a revenue division in the Medak district of Telangana, India. Haldi River also called  by Pasupuleru, Haridranadi, kondavagu, Toorpurani etc names. Toopran  word is metamorphic  change of Toorpurani.

Geography 

Eminent persons 
 Gummadi Vittal Rao popularly known as Gaddar was born here in 1949.

References 

Villages in Medak district